Bratushkovo is a village in Slivnitsa Municipality, Sofia Province, located in western Bulgaria approximately 8 km south-west of the town of Slivnitsa. 

The village was first mentioned in Ottoman tax registers of 1576 as Bratkovitsa. The name is derived from the personal name Bratushko or Bratko.

References

Villages in Sofia Province